Le championnat de France de première division fédérale, a.k.a. Fédérale 1, is a French rugby union club competition, the fifth highest level of amateur rugby. The competition has been organised by the Fédération Française de Rugby since 2000, when it replaced the B2 Group. The championship is contested between 40 teams and named in honor of the famous former FC Lourdes and French International player, Jean Prat.

Format
The format has two phases with many steps. Before the 2015–16 season, the structure was even more complex.

Preliminary phase

A total of 10 teams compete on a double round-robin basis (18 games) in each of the 4 groups. At the end of this phase, the teams are divided as follows:
 At roughly the midpoint of the season, the French Rugby Federation (FFR) announces a list of teams that will be eligible for promotion to the country's second level, Rugby Pro D2, in the following season. Six of these clubs will advance to a set of promotion playoffs, provided that they finish in the top four in their group. Should more than six eligible teams finish in the top four of their respective groups, the top six will be selected based on table points earned (with tiebreakers employed as needed).
 The next-best 4 teams from each group that did not advance to the promotion playoffs move into the championship playoffs (Trophée Jean-Prat).
 The bottom 2 teams from each group are provisionally relegated to Fédérale 2. However, it is not uncommon for a team that would be otherwise relegated to be reprieved due to the financial troubles or complete demise of a higher-placed club.

Second phase
Promotion playoffs
The top six teams of those eligible for promotion advance to a playoff somewhat similar to that used by France's top level, the Top 14. The top two teams receive a bye into the promotion semifinals; the other four teams are seeded based on their table points (3 vs. 6, 4 vs. 5) and play a single match at a neutral site for a place in the semifinals. The 4–5 winner is then paired with the top seed, and the 3–6 winner with the second seed; these teams then play two-legged home-and-away semifinals. The four semifinal teams earn promotion to Nationale 2 and playoff a Fédérale 1 final.

The 2015–16 season was the first in which the Pro D2 promotion playoffs and the Trophée Jean-Prat playoffs were separated.

Championship playoffs
 A total of 16 teams, four from each group, advance to the championship playoffs, with the ultimate winner receiving the Trophée Jean-Prat. All matches prior to the championship final are two-legged, home-and-away ties; the final is a one-off match held at a neutral site.

Starting in 2017–18, only one team will be automatically promoted from Fédérale 1 to Pro D2, namely the league champion. This will presumably be accomplished by playing the promotion playoffs through a final. Through the 2019–20 season, two teams will continue to be promoted each season, but the second promotion place will go to a "wildcard" club selected by Ligue Nationale de Rugby, which operates the Top 14 and Pro D2. The "wildcard" club must be located north of a line running roughly from La Rochelle to Lyon, and show itself to be capable of transitioning to fully professional rugby.

Teams

For the 2019-20 season, there are 48 teams in Fédérale 1, divided into four pools of twelve teams.

The top four teams in each group will take part in promotion play-offs for two promotion places to Pro D2.

Jean-Prat Past Champions
 2000–01: Oyonnax Rugby
 2001–02: Lyon OU
 2002–03: USA Limoges
 2003–04: Pays d'Aix RC
 2004–05: US Colomiers
 2005–06: UA Gaillac
 2006–07: Stade Aurillacois
 2007–08: US Colomiers
 2008–09: CA Lannemezan
 2009–10: US Carcassonne
 2010–11: AS Béziers
 2011–12: US Colomiers
 2012–13: US Bressane
 2013–14: US Montauban
 2014–15: Pays d'Aix RC
 2015–16: SO Chambéry
 2016-17: Rouennais
 2017-18: Lavaur
 2018-19: Rouen

References

3